Yuanbaoshan District (Mongolian:     Yuvan boo šan toɣoriɣ, Юаньбаошань тойрог, Yuanĭbaoşanĭ) is a district of the city of Chifeng, Inner Mongolia, People's Republic of China.

References

www.xzqh.org 

County-level divisions of Inner Mongolia
Chifeng